The Air War School Klotzsche also known as Luftkriegsschule 1 (LKS 1) was a former Luftwaffe school in the Dresden borrow Klotzsche. The Air War School Klotzsche was built in 1935 according to the design by Ernst Sagebiel together with the architect Walter and John Krüger. The school was used during the Third Reich until it was disbanded on 5 March 1945.

Commanding officers
 Generalmajor Oskar Kriegbaum, 1 April 1936 – 30 April 1942
 Generalmajor Josef Brunner, 1 May 1942 – 9 June 1944
 Oberst Lutz, June 1944 – 1944
 Oberst Erich Kaufmann, 16 August 1944 – 16 April 1945

References
 Spur, Franz (2004). Dresdner Fliegerschmiede 1935–1945. Geschichte der Luftkriegsschule 1 Dresden in Klotzsche. Dresden, Germany: Arbeitskreis Sächsische Militärgeschichte. .

External links 

Buildings and structures in Dresden
Military units and formations of the Luftwaffe
Training establishments of the Luftwaffe